22 Jermyn Street is the address of the site of several former hotels, including the Eyrie Mansion and an eponymously named luxury hotel in London, England. Jermyn Street is in St James's in the centre of London's West End, 75 yards from Piccadilly Circus.

History
Jermyn Street began construction in 1664. The first house was built on the site of 22 Jermyn Street in about 1685 and, during the 18th century, it was occupied by tradesmen who served the grandees of St James's Square.

Since 1685, it functioned as a hotel, with tradesmen supplementing their incomes by sub-letting the top rooms as residential chambers to "wealthy men-about-town."

By 1861, 22 Jermyn Street was the residence of Italian silk merchant Cesare Salvucci.

Around 1876, it was purchased by a military tailor amongst whose lodgers were banker Theodore Rothschild.

The current building was constructed in the 1870s as the home of an English gentleman and came under the ownership of the Togna family from 1915. Henry Togna ran the Eyrie Mansion hotel selling to his son, Henry Jr. The building was reopened in 1990 as a formal hotel and the rooms  retained their eccentricity with traditional English furnishings. The hotel closed on October 1, 2009.

The hotel
The hotel has been described by Frommer's travel guide as "London's premier town-house hotel, a bastion of elegance and discretion", with its sixth floor denoted as "featuring one of the best-equipped computer centers in London."

The hotel had a newsletter and also a separate Restaurant Newsletter of an annual circulation of over 56,000 a year.

In February 2010,  American film critic Roger Ebert criticized its impending demolition. He wrote of his  experience at The Eyrie Mansion:

Awards
Since the hotel opened in 1990 it has won numerous awards, including Where Magazine's 'Small Hotel of the Year' in 1993,  SLH 'Hotel of the Year' in 1995,  Good Hotel Guide 'Cesar Award' in 1996,  'London's Premier Townhouse Hotel', and the Gault Millau in 1999. Owner Henry Togna was voted one of the World's Best Hoteliers' Entrée in 1998.

References

External links
Official site

Defunct hotels in London
Houses completed in 1870
1685 establishments in England
Hotels established in 1990
Hotels disestablished in 2009
St James's
2009 disestablishments in England